C16 (PKRi, GW 506033X) is a drug which acts as a selective inhibitor of the enzyme double-stranded RNA-dependent protein kinase (PKR). It has been shown to effectively inhibit PKR function in vivo and has neuroprotective and nootropic effects in animal studies.

See also 
 S-17092

References 

Nootropics